Sunset Heat is a 1992 thriller film directed by John Nicolella (in his theatrical film directorial debut) and starring Michael Paré, Adam Ant, and Dennis Hopper. It featured original music by Jan Hammer, who previously worked with Nicolella on the television series Miami Vice.

Plot
Photographer Eric Wright from New York City visits his friend Danny Rollinsin Los Angeles. Danny had stolen a million dollars from drug dealer Carl Madson, a former partner of Eric. When Danny is murdered without having told anyone where the money is, Carl demands that Eric finds it for him even though he has no idea where it might be.

Cast
 Michael Paré as Eric Wright
 Adam Ant as Danny Rollins
 Dennis Hopper as Carl Madson 
 Daphne Ashbrook as Julie
 Charlie Schlatter as David
 Tracy Tweed as Lena
 Little Richard as Brandon
 Luca Bercovici Detective Cook
 Tony Todd as Drucker
 Joe Lara as Todd
 Michael Talbott as Bartender
 Cindy Valentine as Holly
 Julie Strain as Silver Statuette
 Paul Ben-Victor as New Yorker

References

External links
 
 

1992 films
1990s English-language films
1992 thriller films
American thriller films
Films directed by John Nicolella
1992 directorial debut films
1990s American films